"I Know What You Need" is a fantasy/horror short story by American writer Stephen King, first published in the September 1976 issue of Cosmopolitan, and later collected in King's 1978 collection Night Shift.

Plot summary
Told from the perspective of a popular, college-age girl named Elizabeth Rogan, the premise of this story concerns her sudden, unexpected attraction to a social outcast named Ed Hamner, Jr., whose paranormal ability to perceive what will make any person happy has not resulted in his own happiness. Elizabeth first meets Ed when she is cramming for a sociology final, offering to buy her a strawberry ice cream cone, which was on her mind. Ed offers her the answer key to the final, claiming he had already completed the class. She gets an A on the final, saving her scholarship, but breaks to Ed that she has a boyfriend named Tony. Trouble soon follows for her, in what she anticipated to be a great summer turns out to be worst, as tips at her job at a seaside resort are sparse due to a combination of lousy weather and high gas prices. Even worse, Tony is pressuring her to drop out of school and get married, claiming his construction job can provide for them both. Her apprehension turns into a nightmare, but one week later Tony has died. Tony was killed on the job when they had been doing road work, and it was Tony's turn to flag traffic when he was hit by a Fiat. An investigation revealed the brakes malfunctioned and no one was at fault. Ed reappears at the time when she feels she is over Tony's death, and the two being dating, with it seems that he is the perfect boyfriend. 

Elizabeth's roommate, suspicious of Ed from the start, warns Elizabeth repeatedly, but Elizabeth is too enamored with Ed to listen. Her roommate finally tells Elizabeth that Ed is manipulating her, setting up circumstances to make himself seem perfect for her: "That's not love... that's rape." The roommate's father had also expressed concern to the point he hired a detective agency to do a background check on Ed Hamner, where it was revealed that he had attended the same elementary school in Connecticut she did, but moved away after first grade as his father was a compulsive gambler who moved to San Jose to flee debt collectors from the Mafia. The father saw use of Ed's gift to reverse his fortunes at gambling, soon becoming a big winner, then later using his son's ability to invest in the stock market. Ed's mother, a religious woman, had been committed due to her repeated ramblings she had given birth to the devil. The background check also shows that Ed was never enrolled in courses at their college, and thus could not have had the professor from Elizabeth's sociology course the previous term. Nor does it show any employment records at the theatre he claims to have worked, and the sports car he owned could not have been afforded even if he spent his yearly salary. The roommate reveals that Ed Hamner Sr. died in an accident along with his wife in a manner similar to Tony's death; they had been out picknicking when their car careened over a cliff. As Ed Hamner Jr. was the sole suriviving member of the family, he inherited his father's stock portfolio of well over $1 million. Only gradually do the warnings take hold; Elizabeth finally locates a diary Ed has kept, documenting how he has been secretly craving Elizabeth's love since childhood, and has employed a variety of black magic rituals and charms to murder her aggressive boyfriend and manipulate her emotions. She finds how his residence is akin to a Potemkin village, where his bedroom is a mess, reflecting his unkempt personal appearance, whereas the front is well kept, likely to impress Elizabeth and other guests. She finds voodoo dolls of his parents, as well as herself. Other items she finds are an answer key with "BETH" written in grease pencil on it, and a toy model of a Fiat. She is then confronted by Ed, who calls her an "ungrateful bitch", to which Elizabeth accuses Ed of murdering Tony. Ed fully admits to using his powers to eliminate Tony, defending himself by saying he did it for her; to save her from an unhappy marriage.

While this story flirts with casting a sympathetic light on Ed's character (describing his sad childhood, and his inability to please his abusive parents despite his amazing gift, mainly by winning them large gambling jackpots), when his plans are ultimately brought to ruin, he is revealed less as a product of anti-elitism and more as a childish, murderous coward, morally corrupt and self-serving. Knowing that his magic will always keep a (somewhat small) emotional hold on her, Elizabeth crushes his voodoo doll of her, destroying the small amount of pity she still feels for him.

References to other works
Shawn S. Lealos directed a short dollar baby film based on this story under Starving Dogs Productions.
One of the books Ed has is the Necronomicon from the Cthulhu Mythos.
The setting of the story is 1973 to 1974, as the 1973 oil crisis and The Godfather are mentioned.

Film version
An upcoming film version of the story was filmed in July 2021 through crowdfunding and is directed by Julia Marchese, who cites the story as her favorite among King's works. A teaser trailer was released on August 30, 2022.

See also
 Stephen King short fiction bibliography

References

External links

Stephen King Short Movies Trailer

Short stories by Stephen King
1978 short stories
Fantasy short stories
Cthulhu Mythos short stories
Horror short stories
Works originally published in Cosmopolitan (magazine)
Short stories adapted into films